Andinotrechus is a genus of ground beetles in the family Carabidae. This genus has a single species, Andinotrechus naranjoi, found in Venezuela.

References

Trechinae